Justin Fiddes (born January 3, 1996) is a former American soccer player.

Career

College 
Fiddes played four years of college soccer at the University of Washington between 2014 and 2017. During his time at Washington, Fiddes was named Second Team All Far-West Region, and received an Honorable Mention All-Pac-12 Conference honors following his senior season.

While at college, Fiddes spent time with Premier Development League sides Puget Sound Gunners, San Diego Zest and SoCal Surf.

Professional 
On January 17, 2018, Fiddes was selected 17th overall in the 2018 MLS SuperDraft by Vancouver Whitecaps FC. He signed with the Whitecaps on March 8, 2018.

On May 1, 2018, Fiddes was loaned to Vancouver's United Soccer League affiliate Fresno FC for their 2018 season.

On July 2, 2018, Fiddes was waived by Vancouver.

On August 8, 2018 Fiddes signed with the LA Galaxy II.

References

External links

Washington Huskies bio

1996 births
Living people
American soccer players
American expatriate soccer players
Association football defenders
Expatriate soccer players in Canada
Fresno FC players
LA Galaxy II players
Puget Sound Gunners FC players
San Diego Zest players
SoCal Surf players
Soccer players from San Diego
USL Championship players
USL League Two players
Vancouver Whitecaps FC draft picks
Vancouver Whitecaps FC players
Washington Huskies men's soccer players